Ghodasgaon is a village in Muktainagar taluka of Jalgaon district in Maharashtra. It is located near the Purna river in Muktainagar.

History
In 1954 Ghodasgaon was part of the East Khandesh district and was part of Edlabad petha. A 1911 British mammals survey near Ghodasgaon found a prevalence of wild pigs and monkeys. In 1956 Ghodasgaon became part of the newly formed Bombay state.

The village was previously situated on the banks of Purna river, but was relocated to the current site by the district government to avoid persistent flooding threats during the rainy season. In 1990-91 the local government started to make roads for the new village.

Geography
Purna river flows from the north side of the village. Muktainagar is 10 km from the village. Ghodasgaon is situated near national highway 53, and is nearby the villages of Taroda, Ruikheda, Pimpri Aakraut. The nearest airports are Aurangabad and Jalgaon airports. The Satpuda mountain range is 5 km away from the village.

Population
The village have 757 households and 3287 persons in which 1,697 males and 1,590 females. Population  in age group of 0 to 6 is 406 including 226 male, 180 females. 2321 peoples are literate.

According to 1981 census of Jalgaon district, village population was 2114. In 1991 the population was 2508. Its population in 2001 was 2934.

References

Villages in Jalgaon district